Starkenburg is an unincorporated community in Montgomery County, in the U.S. state of Missouri.

History
A post office called Starkenburg was established in 1888, and remained in operation until 1918. The community was named after Starkenburg, in Germany, the native home of a share of the early settlers.

The Shrine of Our Lady of Sorrows was listed on the National Register of Historic Places in 1982.

See also
St. Martin's Church (Starkenburg, Missouri)

References

 
Unincorporated communities in Montgomery County, Missouri
Unincorporated communities in Missouri